Thamnomolgidae is a family of cyclopoid copepods in the order Cyclopoida. There are at least three genera and four described species in Thamnomolgidae.

Genera
These three genera belong to the family Thamnomolgidae:
 Camotesia Humes, 1990
 Forhania Humes, 1990
 Thamnomolgus Humes, 1969

References

Cyclopoida
Articles created by Qbugbot
Crustacean families